The Miami Sting were a professional indoor football team based in Coral Gables, Florida. The Sting was to play its home games at the BankUnited Center on the campus of the University of Miami in Coral Gables. The Sting folded just before the 2013 season began.

The Sting were the fourth indoor/arena football team to call South Florida home, following the Miami Hooters of the Arena Football League (1993-1995), their relocated form the Florida Bobcats (1996-2001), the Miami Morays of the National Indoor Football League (2005 National Indoor Football League season), and their relocated form the Florida Frenzy (2006), and the Miami Vice Squad (which only played a portion of the 2007 NIFL season before they were suspended and the league folded).

Franchise history

2012

The Sting were originally created to replace the Saginaw Sting, who had left the league to re-join the Continental Indoor Football League (CIFL). The Sting had an agreement to host games at Cambria County War Memorial Arena in Johnstown, Pennsylvania, as well as other cities throughout Western Pennsylvania. On November 30, 2011, they announced that they would be coached by Paul Pennington.

Pennington, his staff, and all signed players resigned after the sale of the team to Jeff Bollinger a Pittsburgh Businessman, after which the Sting were coached by Bollinger, Jeff Hether and Bill Miller during the 2012 season.

The Sting finished their inaugural season with an 0–7 record, last place in the Northern Conference.

2013
The franchise moved to Coral Gables, Florida for the 2013 season, to be known as the Miami Sting. The Sting will play their home games at the BankUnited Center, on the campus of the University of Miami. The franchise named former head coach of the Ontario Warriors, Keith Evans, as their head coach in October 2012.

Players of note

Current roster

Coaches of note

Head coaches

Coaching staff

Season-by-season results

References

External links
Miami Sting official site

Former Ultimate Indoor Football League teams
Sports in Coral Gables, Florida
American football teams in Miami
American football teams established in 2013
American football teams disestablished in 2013
2013 establishments in Florida
2013 disestablishments in Florida